The Portal may refer to:

 The Portal (Antarctica), a mountain pass in the Ross Dependency
 The Portal (community center), a defunct community center for LGBT African Americans in Baltimore, Maryland, US
 The Portal (film), a 2014 Canadian short film
 The Portal (podcast), a podcast hosted by Eric Weinstein

See also
 Portal (disambiguation)